The Dust Diaries is a book by Owen Sheers, published in 2004.

In this work, Sheers traces the travels of his great-great-uncle, Arthur Shearly Cripps.  The book was named "Welsh Book of the Year 2005".

References
 Press Release for The Dust Diaries published by Houghton Mifflin

2004 non-fiction books
Biographies (books)
Travel books